is a Japanese footballer currently playing as a forward for Gainare Tottori.

Career statistics

Club
.

Notes

References

1997 births
Living people
Japanese footballers
Association football forwards
Regionalliga players
J3 League players
Gamba Osaka players
Alemannia Aachen players
SV 19 Straelen players
SV Bergisch Gladbach 09 players
Gainare Tottori players
Japanese expatriate footballers
Japanese expatriate sportspeople in Germany
Expatriate footballers in Germany